Yarmouth is a town in southwestern Nova Scotia, Canada. A port town, industries include fishing, and tourism. It is the terminus of a ferry service to Bar Harbor, Maine, run by Bay Ferries.

History
Originally inhabited by the Mi'kmaq, the region was known as "Keespongwitk" meaning "Lands End" due to its position at the tip of the Nova Scotia peninsula.

European settlement
The region was visited in 1604 by Samuel de Champlain, who named it "Cap-Fourchu", meaning "forked or cloven cape." The first Europeans to make a settlement on these shores were the French Acadians. They set up a small fishing settlement known as "Tebouque" in the mid 1600s and by 1750 the population was 50 people. During the Seven Years' War, New England Planters settled at what is now the town of Yarmouth in 1759; the grantees were from Yarmouth, Massachusetts and they requested that Yarmouth be named after their former home. Yarmouth was founded on June 9, 1761, when a ship carrying three families arrived from Sandwich, Massachusetts. The ship carried the families of Sealed Landers, Ebenezer Ellis, and Moses Perry.  During the American Revolution, some in Yarmouth were sympathetic to the rebellion.  Following the war, Acadians originally from the Grand-Pré district who returned from exile in 1767 settled in the Yarmouth area.

American Revolution 

There were a number of inhabitants of Yarmouth who supported the American patriots.  Despite the American Privateer raids in the Raid on Yarmouth, Nova Scotia (1775), the inhabitants still sheltered American prisoners after the Battle off Yarmouth (1777).

After the American Revolution, substantial numbers of United Empire Loyalists arrived in 1785.

Shipbuilding

Through the 19th century the town was a major shipbuilding centre, at one point boasting more registered tonnage per capita than any other port in the world. From 1874 to 1885, Yarmouth was the second largest port of registry in Canada following Saint John, New Brunswick. In 1878, Yarmouth's tonnage peaked at 453 vessels aggregating 166,623 tons, and in 1879, the town had the second largest registered tonnage in Canada.

Yarmouth ships were found in most major ports throughout the world at this time, including ships noted for courageous crews such as the ship Research in 1861 and ships noted for great size such as the ship County of Yarmouth in 1884, one of the largest wooden hull ships ever built in Canada. John Patch, the son of a Yarmouth sea captain, developed and built one of the first modern screw propeller driven ships in 1832 (4 years before John Ericsson's patent). First demonstrated in Yarmouth Harbour during the summer of 1833, Patch was unsuccessful in a patent application in that year, but he continued to improve his propeller and received an American patent in 1849 which drew praise in American scientific circles. However, by 1849 there were multiple competing versions of the screw propeller. Patch never received money or recognition and died a poor man at Yarmouth in 1861.

The town of Yarmouth was incorporated on August 6, 1890.

Railways

As wooden shipbuilding declined in the late 19th century, Yarmouth's shipowners re-invested their capital into factories, iron-hulled steamships, and railways. The town's first railway was the locally owned Western Counties Railway which was built from Yarmouth to Digby in the 1870s.  It eventually was merged into the Dominion Atlantic Railway (DAR), with a network extending into the Annapolis Valley, Halifax and Truro; the DAR later became a subsidiary of Canadian Pacific Railway (CPR).  The Halifax and Southwestern Railway was built along the south shore linking Yarmouth with Shelburne, Liverpool, Bridgewater and Halifax in the early 20th century; the H&SW was eventually merged into the Canadian National Railway (CNR).  While iron-hulled steamships had led to the decline of Yarmouth's once-thriving wooden shipbuilding industry, they also made the port a vital connection between Nova Scotia's rail lines and steamships destined for Boston and New York.  Rail services were abandoned to Yarmouth in stages, beginning in 1982 (CNR) and ending in 1990 (CPR).

Steamships and ferries
Tourism has been a major industry in Yarmouth since the 1880s when Loran Ellis Baker founded the Yarmouth Steamship Company. Steamship and railway promotion based in Yarmouth created the first tourism marketing in Nova Scotia.
Baker's steamships operated between Yarmouth and Boston until 1900, when the company was purchased by the Dominion Atlantic Railway. The DAR and Halifax and Southwestern Railway offered connections for passengers arriving in Yarmouth with steamship services operating to New York City and Boston.

In 1939, examiners at Yarmouth's Merchant Marine Institution made seafaring history by issuing master's papers to Molly Kool, the first female ship captain in the Western World.

Steamship connections between Yarmouth and Boston / New York were maintained by Eastern Steamship Lines but were suspended with the start of World War II; the SS Yarmouth Castle was one of many vessels which served this route. The service resumed a few years after the war with the S.S. Yarmouth, under the same company.  This service continued into the mid 1950s and was then replaced with the M.V. Bluenose.

CNR, CN Marine and Marine Atlantic
Following the war, as the economy of western Nova Scotia improved, the need for a year-round daily service was made evident. The service was needed as a more timely route for transport of goods between markets in Nova Scotia and the United States. Demand increased for passenger traffic as well.  This led citizens of southwestern Nova Scotia to undertake an extensive lobbying effort with the federal government to establish a ferry service in the Gulf of Maine connecting Yarmouth with a port in New England.  In 1949 the Canadian Maritime Commission began to study the possibility of a ferry service connecting with a port in the US. After some controversy as to whether to return to the traditional Boston or New York service, a decision was made to focus the effort on a service from Yarmouth to Bar Harbor.  In 1954 the federal government contracted Davie Shipbuilding to construct MV Bluenose which was launched in 1955 and began service in 1956 under the management of Canadian National Railway (CNR) and later (1977-1982) under the management of a federal Crown corporation named CN Marine.

In 1978 CN Marine started operating MV Marine Evangeline on a service from Yarmouth to Portland, Maine.  In 1982 the old Bluenose was retired from the Bar Harbor service and sold.  CN Marine replaced her with a newer vessel MV Stena Jutlandica which was renamed MV Bluenose to prevent confusion in tourism marketing literature.

In 1986 CN Marine was reorganized into the Crown corporation Marine Atlantic and in 1997 the federal government decided to end its financial support for the Gulf of Maine ferry service, soliciting proposals from private sector ferry companies to operate the route.

Lion Ferry, Prince of Fundy Cruises, Scotia Prince Cruises
The growth of post-war automobile-based tourism saw the provincial government encourage additional ferry service with New England, a region with many family connections to the Maritimes dating to the 18th century and which accelerated during the first half of the 20th century.  In 1970 the MV Bluenose service operated by CNR was joined by the MS Prince of Fundy on a route connecting Yarmouth with Portland, Maine operated by Lion Ferry.  The service was supplemented between 1973 and 1976 by MS Bolero, however by 1976 both vessels were replaced by the MS Caribe.  Lion Ferry sold Yarmouth's second ferry service to Prince of Fundy Cruises who purchased MS Stena Olympica and renamed it MS Scotia Prince.  The service underwent another ownership change in 2000 and was renamed Scotia Prince Cruises.  In 2004 the company discovered toxic mould in its Portland terminal, owned by the City of Portland, canceling its 2005 season.  The City of Portland subsequently canceled the company's lease and evicted Scotia Prince Cruises, thus ending this ferry service.

Bay Ferries

In 1997 Bay Ferries, a subsidiary of Northumberland Ferries Limited, was the successful bidder for the federal government's Gulf of Maine ferry service.  Only the operating licence was transferred as well as the right to be the primary user of the federal government-owned ferry terminals in Yarmouth and Bar Harbor; the service would receive no subsidy from the federal government.  Bay Ferries purchased MV Bluenose from Marine Atlantic and used that vessel for the remainder of the 1997 season before selling it.

In 1998 Bay Ferries introduced the first high speed catamaran passenger-vehicle ferry service in North America when it purchased HSC Incat 046 from Incat in an aggressive bid to expand the Yarmouth - Bar Harbor ferry service.  Throughout the 1990s the market for ferry services in southwestern Nova Scotia was threatened by significant expansions of 4-lane expressways in northern Nova Scotia and across southern New Brunswick so it was theorized that the Yarmouth - Bar Harbor ferry service could maintain market share if the ferry voyage time was shortened.  Marketed as "The Cat", the use of the ferry service grew largely due to Bay Ferries' investment and the novelty of riding the ultra-modern high speed catamaran.  In 2002 Bay Ferries traded in HSC Incat 046 for a larger vessel HSC The Cat which was also marketed as "The Cat".  Beginning in 2003, Bay Ferries began operating HSC The Cat during the winter months on services in the Caribbean.

Following the end of the service offered by Scotia Prince Cruises in 2004, Bay Ferries began operating HSC The Cat in 2006 between Yarmouth to Portland, in addition to Bar Harbor; the old Portland ferry terminal being replaced by the newly built Ocean Gateway International Marine Passenger Terminal.  Following a decline in American tourism to Nova Scotia, as well as record-high fuel prices, Bay Ferries sought subsidies from the federal and provincial governments for its Gulf of Maine ferry service.  The federal government refused to provide a subsidy, having removed itself from operating such a service in 1997.  However, the provincial government offered a subsidy to cover the operating loss and this was subsequently provided in 2007, 2008 and 2009.  In 2009 the provincial government canceled the subsidy and Bay Ferries announced in December 2009 that it was ending its ferry service and sold the vessel.

Nova Star Cruises
In 2013 the provincial government posted a request for proposals for re-establishing a Yarmouth - Maine ferry service, stating that a successful proponent would receive a $21 million subsidy over a 7-year period.  In September 2013 it was announced that Nova Star Cruises was the successful proponent and in November 2013 it was confirmed that the service would start May 1, 2014 with the MV Nova Star offering daily round trips between Yarmouth and Portland.  Nova Star Cruises also announced it was examining the possibility of using the vessel during the winter months on a service between Colombia and Panama bypassing the Darién Gap. Nova Star's contract to provide ferry services between Yarmouth and Portland was not renewed for 2016.

Return of The Cat

On March 24, 2016, Bay Ferries Limited announced that it had reached an agreement with the U.S. Maritime Administration and the U.S. Navy for a multi-year charter of HST-2.  The vessel will be operated for a passenger/vehicle ferry service in the Gulf of Maine between Portland, Maine and Yarmouth. The service and vessel will be branded as The CAT to align with the previous branding used by Bay Ferries. The vessel underwent a refit at a shipyard in South Carolina and the service began on June 15, 2016.

Second World War
During the first year of the Second World War, Yarmouth was selected as the location for a British Commonwealth Air Training Plan (BCATP) facility. RCAF Station Yarmouth was originally opened in 1940 as three separate training sites (the East Camp, the West Camp and the Air Base).

The East Camp was home to a detachment of the Royal Air Force's No. 34 Operational Training Unit (from RCAF Station Pennfield Ridge), who trained bomber crews, as well as the Royal Navy's No. 1 Naval Air Gunners School who were located at Yarmouth from 1 January 1943 to 30 March 1945.

The West Camp was home to an RCAF Anti-Submarine Bomber Reconnaissance Squadron and several Eastern Air Command Bomber Reconnaissance Squadrons, such as 162 Squadron.

The Air Base was home to the 9th Light Anti-Aircraft Artillery, various RCAF and RAF Bomber Squadrons and an Army Co-operation Reconnaissance Flight. Its primary function was as an administrative and logistical support base to the RAF and RCAF squadrons in the area, in addition to providing a Weather Information Section, an Armament Section and a firing range.

The sinking resulted in 43 casualties and no survivors.

Several smaller installations associated with RCAF Station Yarmouth were located in southwestern Nova Scotia, including a bombing range at Port Maitland, a fuel depot at Digby, and radar detachments at Plymouth, Tusket, Bear Point, Port Mouton and Rockville. In 1944, a detachment of the US Navy briefly came to Yarmouth to test the effectiveness of a blimp service. After a crash, the RCAF decided against this venture.

RCAF Station Yarmouth closed in 1945. The airfield was sold to the Department of Transport in 1946 and became the Yarmouth Airport. A Canadian Army training camp (known as Camp 60) on Parade Street also provided basic and artillery training for 20,000 soldiers during the war.

Culture
The Western Branch of the Art Gallery of Nova Scotia is located in Yarmouth. The town is also home to the Yarmouth County Museum & Archives which preserves the history of the town and surrounding county and operates the Killam Brothers building on the waterfront. The Firefighters Museum, part of the Nova Scotia Museum system and the privately run Sweeney Fisheries Museum are also located in Yarmouth.

The Izaak Walton Killam Memorial house, founded in 1963, serves as the town's public library.  It is the largest branch of Western Counties Regional Library and houses the regional library's headquarters.

The Yarmouth Arts Regional Council was established in 1974, under the leadership of Lydia Davison, a local music teacher. Over the next five years, with the assistance of the Canada Council and many volunteers, the Yarmouth Arts Regional Centre (Th'YARC) was constructed on the site of a former garage on Parade Street. Th'YARC continues to operate to this day, with the 350-seat Lydia Davison Theatre, an art gallery and a print-making shop.

A popular but unsupported cultural belief in Yarmouth holds that the American composer Meredith Willson wrote his well-known song "It's Beginning to Look a Lot Like Christmas" while staying in Yarmouth's Grand Hotel.

In August 2004, a record mako shark was caught off the coast of Yarmouth during the Yarmouth Shark Scramble. It is considered one of the largest mako sharks ever caught.

Seafest is an annual 7 day festival organized since 1979.

Buildings and structures
Yarmouth is known for some of the most exuberant examples of Victorian houses styles in the Maritimes, a legacy of the wealthy captains and shipowners of the town's seafaring Golden Age. A heritage district preserves several blocks of these residences, including the Lovitt House and Eakin/Hatfield House. On the waterfront, two historic warehouses survive from the sailing era, the Killam Brothers and Parker-Eakin's buildings, each with an associated wharf, which are the focal points of summer waterfront events.

Yarmouth's Main Street is marked by several distinctive Victorian commercial buildings such as the turreted Yarmouth Block Building. The largest building in the town is a 1970s hotel, the Rodd Grand Hotel. It is built on the site of the original Grand Hotel, a Second Empire hotel which was the town's landmark for many years.

A landmark for Yarmouth Harbour is the large Cape Forchu Lighthouse which is located a few kilometers away at the headland of Cape Forchu, the peninsula that guards Yarmouth Harbour. The tall "apple core" style is a notable example of modernist style light tower.

Climate

Yarmouth has a humid continental climate (Köppen: Dfb), closely bordering on an oceanic climate (Köppen: Cfb), typical of climates surrounded by the sea but close to large continents such as southern Norway and coastal Hokkaido but with latitude variations. Being exactly in the -3 °C isotherm in the average of the coldest month (east of the city), causing that in peninsular areas like Yarmouth Bar and Cape Forchu are between a transition band for the oceanic climates (Cfb). Winters are cool and rainy with a January average of  though owing to strong maritime influences, temperatures below  are very rare, and the average high never drops to below freezing at any point in the year. During this period of time, the weather can be unsettled and cloudy due to the Nor'easters coming up the coast from the southwest. As a result, Yarmouth averages only 68–100 hours of sunshine from December to February or 25%–34% of possible sunshine.

Yarmouth's summers are cool due to the strong coastal influence from the sea which keeps summer temperatures cool, meaning temperatures above  are very rare. Spring and fall are transitional seasons in which falls are warmer than spring since the waters are at the warmest temperatures in fall and the coldest during early spring. Precipitation is significant, averaging over  a year, with July and August the driest months on average and November the wettest month on average. An outstanding feature is Yarmouth's late-fall to early-winter precipitation maximum, owing to the combination of intense storm activity from November to January and relatively more-stable summers, with thunderstorm activity here much less frequent than in the U.S. Northeast, Mid-Atlantic and points southward. Yarmouth averages 1898 hours of sunshine or 42% of possible sunshine with summer being the sunniest and winter being the cloudiest. Yarmouth averages 191 days of fog each year.

Demographics 

The town has long held the highest teen pregnancy rate in the province. Many studies have been done using teenagers in the town to examine the phenomenon.

Media
Yarmouth has been featured as a playable location in the 2014 video game Assassin's Creed Rogue, which takes place during the French and Indian War, and the Seven Years' War.

See also

References

Notes

External links

Populated coastal places in Canada
Populated places established in 1761
Towns in Nova Scotia